Miss India or Femina Miss India is a national beauty pageant in India that annually selects representatives to compete in Miss World, one of the Big Four major international beauty pageants. It is organised by Femina, a women's magazine published by The Times Group. Since 2013 to 2022, Femina also organised Miss Diva as a separate competition, with representatives competing at Miss Universe.

In addition to Miss Diva, the organisation holds a contest every two years to select the Indian representative for the Mister World and Mister Supranational pageants.

The reigning Femina Miss India (Femina Miss India World) titleholder is Sini Sadanand Shetty of Karnataka who was crowned by the outgoing titleholder Manasa Varanasi on 3 July 2022 at Jio World Center, Mumbai.

History

The first Miss India was Pramila (Esther Victoria Abraham), from Calcutta, who won in 1947. It was organised by the local press.

In 1952, two Miss India pageants were held, Indrani Rehman and Nutan were the winners of the pageant. Nutan was crowned as Miss Mussorie. The pageant was held by the local press. Indrani Rehman was crowned at Brabourne Stadium in Mumbai in the month of April 1952. Indrani later represented India at Miss Universe 1952, the inaugural edition of Miss Universe pageant.

In 1953, Peace Kanwal from Punjab was crowned Miss India 1953 at KARDAR-KOLYNOS Pageant. The pageant was organised by Abdur Rashid Kardar. She later established herself as a Bollywood actress.

In 1954, Leela Naidu from Maharashtra was declared Miss India, and the same year was featured in Vogue magazine's list of the world's ten most beautiful women.

There was no Miss India pageant from 1955 to 1958. In 1959, Eve's Weekly organised its very first Miss India contest called Eve's Weekly Miss India to send India's representatives to the Miss World pageant. Fleur Ezekiel was crowned the eventual winner. She represented India at Miss World 1959 held in London, United Kingdom.

The first Femina Miss India pageant was held in year 1964. Meher Castelino Mistri of Maharashtra was crowned the first Femina Miss India. She was chosen to represent India at Miss Universe 1964 held in the United States and Miss Nations 1964 held in Spain.

Reita Faria was the first Miss India ever to win any international beauty pageant. She was crowned Miss World 1966 in London, United Kingdom. She was the winner of Eve's Weekly Miss India contest. The same year Femina Miss India winner Yasmin Daji represented India at Miss Universe 1966 and was crowned 3rd Runner-up at the event. She was the first Femina Miss India Winner to get placed at any international beauty pageant.

Zeenat Aman was the first Femina Miss India titleholder to win an international pageant. She was crowned Femina Miss India Asia Pacific and went on to win Miss Asia Pacific 1970 held in Philippines.

Meenakshi Seshadri the youngest contestant who won the title, 
She won the Miss India contest at the age of 17 in the year 1981 and was known for phenomenal acting in 'Hero' 'Damini', 'Ghayal' and 'Ghatak'. She quit the industry very early and got married.

In 1993 Miss Femina India, Vaishali Sood, daughter of Cdr Sudhir Sood, who was the winner of the 1991 Navy May Queen Ball, stood second runner up. She went on to act in a Bollywood Movie, Mr Bond, starring Akshay Kumar.

In 2002, the third winner was designated to Miss Earth instead of Miss Asia Pacific.

In 2010, after the I Am She - Miss Universe India acquired the rights to send India's representatives to Miss Universe, Femina Miss India crowned three winners as Femina Miss India World, Femina Miss India Earth and Femina Miss India International, the third winner represented India in Miss International pageant.

In 2010, Tantra Entertainment Pvt. Ltd. (TEPL), in partnership with Sushmita Sen, started a new pageant called I Am She – Miss Universe India. The winner of this pageant participated in the Miss Universe pageant from 2010 to 2012.

Competition irregularities 
In 2008, Gladrags President Maureen Wadia provided legal notice to newly crowned Femina Miss India Earth 2008, Harshita Saxena for violating an exclusive two-year contract with Gladrags that had been signed by Harshita in 2006. To participate in any other beauty pageant, Harshita would need a written letter of no objection from Gladrags. Harshita surrendered the title and the crown went to Tanvi Vyas, who represented India at the Miss Earth 2008 pageant held in November 2008. Later, Harshita was ranked fourth at Femina Miss India 2009 and represented India at Miss International 2009. Harshita was later placed fourth in Miss India 2009 and represented India in Miss International 2009.

In 2004, Lakshmi Pandit (Kalpana Pandit's sister) was initially declared the winner, but had to return the title as she was married (to Siddarth Mishra); Sayali Bhagat was finally declared the winner.

In 1989, the winner Kalpana Pandit was found to have misrepresented her nationality (she had a US passport); she was stripped of her title and Dolly Minhas was declared the winner.

India in international pageants 

Miss India has been participating in the Miss Universe pageant since 1952, starting with Indrani Rehman and in the Miss World pageant since 1959, starting with Fleur Ezekiel.

In the 1970s, Femina acquired the rights to send a representative to Miss World as well, and started to send the winner to Miss Universe and the runner-up to the Miss World contest. Later in 1991, Femina Miss India also acquired the rights to send India's representatives to Miss International pageant.

In 1994, following India's historic dual wins at both Miss Universe and Miss World, the custom of crowning a single winner was discontinued. Instead, the top three placers were designated winners with equal visibility, equal prizes and responsibilities, and were crowned as Femina Miss India-Universe, Femina Miss India-World, and Femina Miss India-Asia Pacific and a finalist was sent to Miss International. In 2002, the third title was changed to Femina Miss India-Earth, to designate India's representation at the newly launched Miss Earth pageant, focused on the cause of environmental advocacy and a finalist was sent to Miss International.

From 2007 to 2009, three equal winners were selected going to Miss Universe, Miss World, and Miss Earth. In 2010, I Am She - Miss Universe India acquired the rights to send India's representatives to Miss Universe. Later, in 2013 The Times Group again acquired the rights to send India's representatives to Miss Universe and launched a new pageant for Miss Universe named Miss Diva.

In 1970, Zeenat Aman won Miss Asia Pacific 1970. She became the first Indian and South Asian woman to win the title.

The awards for 1989 were given at the end of the year (December); hence there was no separate contest for 1990.

In 1994, Sushmita Sen won the Miss Universe title after winning the Miss India crown and became the first Indian woman ever to win the Miss Universe crown. The same year the runner-up of Miss India, Aishwarya Rai, won the Miss World title. Sushmita Sen and Aishwarya Rai established themselves in the Bollywood industry after winning their titles.

The success of Sen and Rai spawned coaching institutions which were set up to groom young women in pageant participation skills. The number of participants in the preliminary rounds of the pageant has increased considerably. Miss India World 1997, Diana Hayden won the title of Miss World 1997. In 1999, the Miss India World Yukta Mookhey went on to win the Miss World that year.

In 2000, three of the Miss India winners won their respective international pageants — Lara Dutta (Miss Universe), Priyanka Chopra (Miss World) and Diya Mirza Miss Asia Pacific. The other country to have won all three major titles in one year were Australia in 1972.

In 2010, after the introduction of I Am She - Miss Universe India, the third title was changed to Femina Miss India-International and the winner represented India at Miss International pageant.

In 2010, Nicole Faria became the first Indian to win the Miss Earth title in Vietnam, which leaves Miss International as the only major international pageant that has not been won by an Indian contestant.

In 2012, Himangini Singh Yadu won Miss Asia Pacific World 2012 and became first Indian and Asian to win the pageant. She was sent by I Am She - Miss Universe India pageant.

In 2013, Srishti Rana won Miss Asia Pacific World 2013 giving India a rare back to back victory. She is the second Indian and first Miss Diva Winner to win Miss Asia Pacific World Crown. She is also the first Indian delegate to win an international pageant that has been sent by Femina Miss India's sister pageant, Miss Diva.

In 2014, Asha Bhat, Miss Diva Supranational 2014 won Miss Supranational 2014 and became the first Indian woman to win the crown. Asha is the second Asian to win the crown. The same year Ruhi Singh who was crowned the first Femina Miss India Universal Peace and Humanity won the first Miss Universal Peace and Humanity pageant held in Lebanon.

After May Myat Noe, the winner of Miss Asia Pacific World 2014 pageant was dethroned, the organisation organised another pageant named Miss Asia Pacific 2014 Supertalent of the World Season 5 under Miss Asia Pacific World title, Swetha Raj who represented India won the crown, giving India a rare back to back to back victory, India is the only country to win any international pageant three years in a row, however Swetha was sent by Miss India Australia organisation.

International victories
When Reita Faria of India won Miss World 1966, she became the first Asian to do so, and India won its first Big Four title. Sushmita Sen was crowned Miss Universe 1994, becoming the country's first Miss Universe winner. Later that year, Aishwarya Rai added to India's winning streak by becoming Miss World 1994, making the country the last in the twentieth century to win both Miss Universe and Miss World in the same year.

Diana Hayden then won the Miss World title in 1997. Actor and model Yukta Mookhey was later crowned Miss World 1999. Six years after Sushmita Sen and Aishwarya Rai's double wins, Lara Dutta and Priyanka Chopra replicated the feat in 2000, marking the most recent time (as of ) that any country has won back-to-back at Miss World and, to date, the only time that any country won Miss Universe and Miss World in the same year in the 21st century. India's appearances at the Miss Universe semifinals from 1992 to 2002 made it the first country in the Eastern Hemisphere to place annually at the pageant for at least 10 consecutive years.

In 2010, Nicole Faria from Bangalore became the first Indian woman to win the Miss Earth pageant. Manushi Chhillar won the Miss World 2017 title. In 2021, Harnaaz Sandhu became the third Indian woman to win Miss Universe title, becoming the most recent Big 4 pageant titleholder from India as of 

The following is the list of Indian winners in the Big Four international beauty pageants:

The following is the list of Indian winners in various other international pageants:

Multiple victories in the same year
The following is the list of India's multiple victories in major international pageants:

Femina Miss India Winners from 2013–present

Femina Miss India

Femina Miss India Regional Ranking

State Ranking

Femina Miss India Editions

Miss Diva winners

Representatives to Big Four pageants
The following women have represented India in the Big Four international beauty pageants, the four major international beauty pageants for women. These are Miss World, Miss Universe, Miss International, Miss Earth.

Color key

Current franchise

Miss World
India did not send delegates in 1967, 1965, 1964, 1963.
From 1959 to 1966 representatives to Miss World were sent by Eve's Weekly Miss India pageant. In 1968, Bharat Sundari got the franchise to send India's representative to Miss World. They sent the delegates from 1968 to 1970, 1972, 1975. Femina got the franchise in 1976. Femina also sent delegates to Miss World in 1971 and 1974. Traditionally the runner up in Miss India pageant was sent to Miss World but this changed in 2013 and now the winner of Miss India is sent to represent at Miss World.

Miss Universe
India did not compete in the Miss Universe pageant from 1953 to 1963. I AM She – Miss Universe India sent its delegates to Miss Universe from 2010 to 2012. Traditionally the Miss India Winner was sent to Miss Universe and the runner up was sent to Miss World; however since 2013 a separate pageant Miss Diva has been held to send delegates to Miss Universe and the Miss India winner will represent India at Miss World annually.

Miss Supranational 
Femina Miss India and Miss Diva (The Times Group) acquired the rights to send India representatives to Miss Supranational only from the year 2013.

Former Franchise

Miss International 
 
Femina Miss India dropped the franchise of Miss International in 2015. The last representative to Miss International from Femina Miss India was Jhataleka Malhotra in 2014.
 
India did not send delegates to Miss International in 1963–1967, 1972, 1977, 1989, 1990.
From 1960 to 1988 Eve's Weekly Miss India sent India's representatives to Miss International pageant.
In the year 2013, Miss Diva winner was sent to Miss International.

Miss Earth 

Femina Miss India dropped the Miss Earth Franchise in 2014 after Alankrita Sahai being the last representative from Miss Diva.
 In 2019, Miss Divine Beauty obtained the right to send India's representative to Miss Earth
 In 2015, Glamanand Supermodel India obtained the rights to send India's representatives to Miss Earth.
 In 2014, Miss Diva winner was sent to Miss Earth pageant.

Miss Grand International 
In the years 2013 and 2014 India's delegates to Miss Grand International were sent by Indian Princess. Femina Miss India acquired the franchise in 2015 till 2019 and 2021.Delegate for Miss Grand International 2020 and 2022 and onwards was sent by Glamanand Supermodel India.

Miss United Continents 
The representatives for Miss United Continents have been selected by Femina Miss India since the pageant's inception in 2013.

Miss Intercontinental 
Indian representatives to Miss Intercontinental is being sent by Femina Miss India group.

Miss Asia Pacific International

Miss Asia Pacific World 
In the years 2011 and 2012, I Am She – Miss India sent their runners-up to this pageant. Femina had franchise to select their representatives in the years 2013 and 2014.

 

India is the only country to win an international pageant three years in a row. In the year 2012, Himangini Singh Yadu was crowned as Miss Asia Pacific World 2012. In the succeeding year Srishti Rana was crowned as Miss Asia Pacific World 2013. In the year 2014, May Myat Noe of Myanmar was originally crowned but later she was dethroned. A new pageant was held by the organizers and Swetha Raj of India became victorious, thus giving India a rare Three-peat victory in an international pageant.

Mister India

Along with Femina Miss India and Miss Diva, the Times Group also organised Mister India pageant to select representative for Mister World and Mister Supranational.

Prateik Jain was the first Mister World India under The Times Group and Jitesh Thakur was the first ever Mister Supranational India.

International victories 

In 2016, Rohit Khandelwal became the first Indian and thus the first Asian to win the Mister World contest title.

In 2018, Prathamesh Maulingkar became the first Indian and thus the first Asian to win the Mister Supranational contest title. This marked India, the only country to win both Miss and Mister Supranational titles.

Titleholders

Editions
Below is the complete list of Mister World India editions.

Mister World

Mister Supranational

Photographs of some notable international titleholders

Miss Universe

Miss World

Miss Supranational

Miss Earth

Miss Tourism International

Mister India

Photographs of some titleholders

Femina Miss India Universe

Femina Miss India World

Femina Miss India Earth

Femina Miss India International

Femina Miss Grand India

Femina Miss India Asia Pacific

Mister India

See also
 Miss Earth India
 Miss Diva
 Miss Transqueen India
 Miss India Worldwide India
 List of beauty pageants

Notes

References

External links
 Femina Miss India  (Official website)

 

Beauty pageants in India
Events of The Times Group
1963 establishments in Maharashtra
Indian awards
India
India